Dion John Lewis (born September 27, 1990) is a former American football running back who played in the National Football League (NFL) for 10 seasons. He played college football at the University of Pittsburgh and was drafted by the Philadelphia Eagles in the fifth round of the 2011 NFL Draft.

After two seasons with the Eagles, Lewis then had stints with the Cleveland Browns and Indianapolis Colts over the next two seasons but never appeared in a game for either team. He then played three seasons with the New England Patriots, with whom he won Super Bowl LI over the Atlanta Falcons in 2017. Lewis then played for the Tennessee Titans for two seasons before playing his final season with the New York Giants.

Early life
A native of Albany, New York, Lewis attended Albany High School, from which he transferred to the Albany Academy and later to Blair Academy, where he led his team to a 17–1 record (.944) his final two seasons, including two MAPL championships and a New Jersey Prep state title. He averaged 12.4 yards per carry as a junior, rushing for 979 yards on 79 carries with 14 touchdowns. As a senior at Blair Academy, Lewis averaged an astounding 14.1 yards per carry, rushing for 1,243 yards on 88 carries. He eclipsed the 250-yard rushing mark four times and scored 26 total touchdowns, including 23 rushing, two on punt returns and one receiving. Lewis was also a three-year letterman in track & field at Blair Academy, where he competed in sprints (11.09 100m and 23.06 200m), long jump (20'2") and relays (44.29 4x100).

College career
Lewis attended and played college football for the University of Pittsburgh from 2009 to 2010, but he was offered a scholarship from just two other schools, Miami of Ohio and Tulane.

2009 season
During twelve regular season games of the 2009 season at the University of Pittsburgh, Lewis accumulated 1,640 rushing yards and 17 touchdowns. He rushed for 180 yards and two touchdowns in an October 2009 victory over Big East rival Rutgers for which he was named Big East Conference Offensive Player of the Week and featured in Sports Illustrated. Following this and later performances, he was mentioned in several news outlets as a possible Heisman Trophy candidate. Lewis had his sixth 100-yard plus rushing game of the season against Syracuse.

He rushed for more than 1,799 yards during the 2009 season and broke Craig Heyward's record at Pittsburgh for rushes in a single game with 47 against University of Cincinnati in the Big East championship game, totaling 194 rushing yards, three touchdowns, as well as five catches for 34 yards.

Lewis was the only freshman and one of four running backs named among 15 "Players to Watch" for the 2009 Walter Camp Player of the Year award. He was also among 16 semifinalists for the Maxwell Award, and was one of ten semifinalists, and the only true freshman, for the Doak Walker Award. Lewis was also honored as a "Midseason All-American" by CBSSports.com and SI.com.

Lewis set the Big East freshman rushing record previously held by Tony Dorsett. The lightly-recruited running back was third nationally in rushing (1,799 yards, 5.5 avg), broke LeSean McCoy's record for most points by a Pitt freshman in the Big East championship against Cincinnati , and Dorsett's record for most rushing yards by a Pitt freshman during the 2009 Meineke Car Care Bowl, after which he was named the game's MVP.

Following the conclusion of the regular season, Lewis was named the National Freshman of the Year by the Sporting News and CBSSports.com, as well as the Offensive Freshman of the Year by College Football News. He was also named a second-team All-American by the Associated Press, Sporting News, CBSSports.com, Sports Illustrated, Rivals.com, and Scout.com. Lewis was the only freshman named to the first or second AP All-American team. Lewis was named both the Big East Conference Rookie of the Year and Offensive Player of the Year as well as the Eastern College Athletic Conference Rookie of the Year.

2010 season
Heading into 2010, the Sporting News, in its 2010 College Football Yearbook, called Lewis "the game's most complete runner" and listed him as one of the five leading candidates for the Heisman Trophy. The Sporting News also listed Lewis as a first-team preseason All-American. Lewis failed to live up to these lofty expectations. After 75 yards in a disappointing loss to unranked Utah, he struggled with just 27 yards against FCS (formerly Division I-AA) New Hampshire while teammate Ray Graham had 115, suffered an upper-body injury after compiling 41 yards to Graham's 100 in a loss to Miami (FL), and sat on the bench while Graham compiled the second-most rushing yards in school history against FIU. Though he had more carries than Graham the rest of the season, the two split rushing duties and it was not until the team's seventh game he broke 100 yards rushing against Rutgers. By far his best game of the season was the regular season finale, where he had 42 carries for 261 yards and four touchdowns, including a 76-yard touchdown run early in the second quarter against Cincinnati. He also had 105 yards and a touchdown in Pitt's BBVA Compass Bowl victory over Kentucky.

In early January, Lewis declared that he would enter the 2011 NFL Draft and forgo his junior and senior seasons.

College statistics

Professional career

Philadelphia Eagles
Lewis was selected with the 149th overall pick in the fifth round of the 2011 NFL Draft by the Philadelphia Eagles. He was the 19th running back selected in that year's draft.

2011 season
On July 27, 2011, Lewis was signed to a four-year contract worth $2.2 million. Lewis spent his rookie season as the Eagles kick returner. He was third on the running back depth chart behind LeSean McCoy and Ronnie Brown and saw little playing time, not carrying the ball more than two times per game until the season finale against the Washington Redskins, when he had 12 carries for 58 yards and his first NFL touchdown.

2012 season
Lewis's role for the Eagles in 2012 was similar to his role in the previous season, as a kick returner primarily. He was once again third on the running back depth chart, behind McCoy and rookie Bryce Brown. He saw no carries prior to Week 12 when the team began giving him some role in the running game, though never touching the ball more than five times in a game. His lone rushing touchdown came in Week 16 on a 17-yard rush against the Washington Redskins.

Cleveland Browns
On April 11, 2013, Lewis was traded to the Cleveland Browns for linebacker Emmanuel Acho. He missed the entire season due to a fractured fibula. He was cut by the Cleveland Browns on August 30, 2014.

Indianapolis Colts
Lewis signed with the Indianapolis Colts on September 9, 2014. He was released on September 16 and did not play again in the 2014 season.

New England Patriots

2015 season
On December 31, 2014, the New England Patriots signed Lewis to a future/reserve contract. Lewis made the team's 53-man roster and saw his first game action on September 10, 2015, in the Patriots' 28–21 win over the Pittsburgh Steelers, after two years of not playing. Starting for the first time in his career in place of a suspended LeGarrette Blount, Lewis recorded 120 yards from scrimmage. Despite facing competition from Blount, Lewis continued a successful start to the season with 138 and 67 total yards respectively in Weeks 2 and 3 against the Buffalo Bills and the Jacksonville Jaguars. Week 2 also saw Lewis score his first touchdown as a Patriot and record six receptions.

On October 8, 2015, after just three games, Lewis signed a two-year contract extension with the Patriots, running through the 2017 season. The contract included a $600,000 signing bonus and $1.8 million in incentives in 2016 and 2017. In his first game after signing the contract, a 30–6 win over the Dallas Cowboys, Lewis rushed six times for 34 yards and caught eight passes for 59 yards and a touchdown. On October 29, in a 36–7 win over the Miami Dolphins, Lewis rushed five times for 19 yards and caught six passes for 93 yards and a touchdown. On November 8, Lewis suffered a torn ACL against the Washington Redskins, causing him to miss the remainder of the 2015 season. He was placed on injured reserve on November 9, 2015. He finished the 2015 season with 234 rushing yards, two rushing touchdowns, 36 receptions, 388 receiving yards, and two receiving touchdowns.

2016 season
On August 30, 2016, Lewis was placed on the Reserve/PUP list to start the 2016 season after requiring a second knee surgery. He was activated to the active roster on November 12, 2016, prior to Week 10 against the Seattle Seahawks. On January 14, 2017, in the Patriots' 34–16 Divisional Round win over the Houston Texans, Lewis became the first player in the Super Bowl era to score touchdowns on a run, a reception, and a kickoff return in the same postseason game. In the AFC Championship against the Pittsburgh Steelers, he was limited to only 19 scrimmage yards in the 36–17 victory. On February 5, 2017, Lewis was part of the Patriots team that won Super Bowl LI. In the game, he had six carries for 27 yards and a catch for two yards as the Patriots defeated the Atlanta Falcons by a score of 34–28 in overtime. The Patriots trailed 28–3 in the third quarter, but rallied all the way back to win the game. The Super Bowl featured the first overtime period and the largest comeback in Super Bowl history.

2017 season

Lewis began the 2017 season as a reserve running back, with new acquisition Mike Gillislee taking the majority of snaps on first and second downs, and receiving specialist James White serving as the primary third-down back. With new acquisition Rex Burkhead also getting playing time, the Patriots were deep at running back and frequently distributed carries among all four of them. Lewis was named the team's primary kick returner. During the first four games, Lewis never carried the ball more than four times in a game, and never ran for more than 18 yards. He also caught a smattering of passes, lining up both in the backfield and split wide. His only touchdown in that stretch came in a narrow 33–30 loss to the Carolina Panthers.

His role on the team changed starting in Week 5, with Gillislee shifting to a short-yardage specialist role, and Lewis became the primary first- and second-down runner. In each week from Week 5 to Week 8, he saw his number of carries increase to 15 per game, and his rushing yardage also increased, frequently accumulating more than 50 yards per game. In Week 10, Lewis had a 103-yard kickoff return touchdown against the Denver Broncos on Sunday Night Football, earning him AFC Special Teams Player of the Week. In Week 12, Lewis ran for a career-high 112 yards in a 35–17 win over the Miami Dolphins. In Week 16, Lewis ran for a new career-high 129 yards and two touchdowns, his first career two rushing touchdown game. He also caught five passes for 24 yards and a touchdown in a 37–16 win over the Buffalo Bills on Christmas Eve. His performance in Week 16 earned him AFC Offensive Player of the Week. He closed out the regular season with 93 rushing yards and a touchdown along with six receptions for 40 yards and a touchdown in a 26–6 victory over the New York Jets.

The 2017 regular season was the first time Lewis appeared in all sixteen regular season games, and the first time since his rookie year he appeared in more than nine games in a season. In the playoffs leading up to Super Bowl LII, he was the Patriots top rusher, amassing 101 yards on the ground over the course of two games against the Tennessee Titans and the Jacksonville Jaguars. He had a key 18-yard run on third-and-9 late in the fourth quarter of the AFC Championship against the Jaguars, gaining a first down and allowing the Patriots to run out the clock to preserve a narrow 24–20 win. In the Super Bowl, Lewis recorded nine carries for 39 yards, but the Patriots lost 41–33 to the Philadelphia Eagles.

Tennessee Titans

On March 15, 2018, Lewis signed a four-year $20 million contract, with an additional $3 million in incentives, with the Tennessee Titans.

Also that offseason, Matt LaFleur was hired as the Titans' new offensive coordinator. LaFleur's offensive scheme often used running backs to catch passes out of the backfield led to success with Todd Gurley in the previous season and was seen as matching Lewis' pass-catching skillset. This led to speculation that LaFleur would favor Lewis over the Titans' emerging running back Derrick Henry.

2018 season
In the Titans' season opener against the Miami Dolphins, Lewis had a solid game with 16 carries for 75 rushing yards and a touchdown to go along with five receptions for 35 yards in the 27–20 defeat. In a Week 7 loss to the Los Angeles Chargers, Lewis ran the ball 13 times for 91 yards. After a Week 8 bye, Lewis was both the leading rusher and receiver in a 28-14 road victory over the Dallas Cowboys on Monday Night Football, rushing for 62 yards on 19 carries and catching four passes for 60 yards and a touchdown. By the end of the season, Lewis' role decreased as Henry emerged as the Titans' main running back.

Lewis finished the 2018 season with 517 rushing yards and a touchdown along with 400 receiving yards and a touchdown.

2019 season
Lewis's role continued to decrease in the 2019 season due to the continuation of Henry's rise. During Week 15 against the Houston Texans, Lewis scored his only touchdown of the year on an 11-yard reception from Ryan Tannehill in the 24–21 loss. In the next game against the New Orleans Saints, he made his only start of the season in place of Henry, who was out with a hamstring injury. Lewis finished the 38–28 loss with 68 rushing yards and a 19-yard reception.

Lewis finished his second and final season with the Titans with 209 rushing yards on 54 carries along with 25 receptions for 164 yards and a touchdown.

On March 12, 2020, Lewis was released by the Titans.

New York Giants
On April 1, 2020, Lewis signed with the New York Giants. Lewis began the season as a backup to Saquon Barkley who was placed on injured reserve after Week 2. For the rest of the season, Lewis split carries with Alfred Morris as backups to Wayne Gallman. Lewis finished the season playing in all 16 games, rushing 29 times for 115 yards and two touchdowns to go along with 18 receptions for 127 yards and a touchdown as the Giants finished with a 6-10 record.

Retirement
On August 13, 2021, Lewis announced his retirement from the NFL after 10 seasons.

NFL career statistics

Regular season

Playoffs

References

External links

 Pittsburgh Panthers bio 
 

1990 births
Living people
African-American players of American football
American football running backs
Blair Academy alumni
Cleveland Browns players
Indianapolis Colts players
New England Patriots players
New York Giants players
Philadelphia Eagles players
Pittsburgh Panthers football players
Players of American football from New York (state)
Sportspeople from Albany, New York
Tennessee Titans players
The Albany Academy alumni
21st-century African-American sportspeople